Consorcio Aviaxsa, S.A. de C.V., doing business as Aviacsa, was a low-cost airline of Mexico with its headquarters in Hangar 1 of Zone C on the property of Mexico City International Airport in Venustiano Carranza, Mexico City, Mexico. The airline operated domestic services until the airline's grounding, radiating from major hubs at Monterrey, Mexico City and Guadalajara, and international service to Las Vegas, Nevada in the USA. Aviacsa also had a U.S. office in Houston.

According to the Department of Communications and Transportation, as of September 2008, Aviacsa ranked as the seventh largest Mexican airline in domestic and international flights, down from the third largest at the end of 2007.

On July 6, 2009, Aviacsa suspended operations due to safety issues. Aviacsa ceased operations on May 4, 2011.

History

Regional era (1990-1994)
The airline was established on May 5, 1990, as a flag carrier airline by the government of the Mexican state of Chiapas in order to fulfill the transportation needs of the fast-growing communities located in that state. They operated their first flight on September 20, 1990, using an 89-seat British Aerospace 146 (BAe 146) regional aircraft between Mexico City and the cities of Tapachula, and Tuxtla Gutiérrez, both located in the state of Chiapas. By the end of the year, the airline received a second BAe 146 and initiated service from the two towns in Chiapas to Villahermosa, Mérida, Oaxaca, Chetumal, and Cancún.

In 1991, Aviacsa exchanged their BAe 146s for four 108-seat Fokker 100 aircraft. With these new planes, the airline was able to initiate flights from Monterrey to Mérida and Cancún, as well as service from Mexico City to Mérida and Villahermosa. Between 1992 and 1995 their main operation hubs were Mérida and Tuxtla Gutiérrez.

Flagship era (1994-2007)
In 1994, Aviacsa exchanged their fleet of Fokker 100s for four 164-seat Boeing 727-200s.  The airline also launched a charter division, temporarily utilizing the Fokker 100s.  The company was privatized and sold to Aerojecutivo, also known as Aeroexo, a charter company based in Monterrey.

In 1995, Aviacsa changed their livery to a white plane, blue stripes, gray bottom, and the iconic smile painted on the nose of their airplanes, making them the second airline to use a smile; the first was Pacific Southwest Airlines.

In 1997, Aviacsa leased two Douglas DC-9-15s and increased frequencies to their destinations.  They announced that in their three years of charter operations, they had successfully carried out 1020 charter flights to cities within Mexico, the United States, the Caribbean, Central America, and South America. Aviacsa and Grupo TACA Airlines announced a partnership in 1998.

In December 1999 the airline acquired four Boeing 737-200s and added them to their fleet.

Between 2000 and 2005, Aviacsa introduced new flights and destinations throughout Mexico, as well as scheduled service to five US cities. In 2000, they changed their image, slogan and corporate logo.  Between 2001 and 2004, the airline began leasing and purchasing used 737-200s to help increase their route capabilities.

In 2005, Aviacsa launched their online ticket shopping webpage, and introduced Boeing 737-300s to replace their 727s.

Low-cost era (2007-2009)
On January 1, 2007, seriously affected by the recently launched Interjet, VivaAerobus and Volaris, Aviacsa began marketing as a low-cost airline, ending service to Chicago, Houston, Los Angeles and Miami, focusing instead on the domestic market.

Suspension era (2009-2011)
In June 2009, the Mexican government grounded 25 aircraft after officials said that the airline had maintenance irregularities. The airline appealed this ruling citing, among other things, reports from the FAA and third-party inspectors which have deemed the airline to be safe.

On July 6, 2009, the Mexican government again grounded the airline for the third time in five weeks over claims that the airline owed over 292 million pesos (about $22 million) in fees for use of Mexican airspace. AVIACSA officials have accused the government of trying to put them out of business in response to pressure from other Mexican airlines. Some of their routes are now being served by Aeromexico Connect and Interjet.

Ceasing operations (2011)
Although Aviacsa was slated to resume operations, on May 4, 2011 it was announced that ticket sales would not continue, casting doubt on the airline's future.

Corporate affairs 
The head office was previously located in García, Nuevo León, Mexico.

Livery 
Aviacsa, since its launch in 1990, featured the stylized head of Pakal — emperor of the Mayan city-state of Palenque — as its corporate image. The logo was modernized several times throughout the airline's history. Aviacsa aircraft also featured a smile on the lower front of the plane.

Slogans 
1991-1998 "Los caminos del cielo maya) (The skyways of the Maya)
1998-1999 "AVIACSA ... para todos" (AVIACSA ... for all)
2000-2009 "La Linea Aerea de Mexico" (The airline of Mexico)
2009-2011 "El cielo vuelve a sonreír” (The sky smiles again)

Destinations

Fleet
Aviacsa included the following aircraft (as of September 2012): 
20 Boeing 737-200 (120 seats)

As of 2011, the average age of the Aviacsa fleet was 26.3 years, the oldest fleet among Mexican airlines.

Retired fleet
BAe 146
Boeing 727-100
Boeing 727-200 Advanced
Fokker 100
McDonnell Douglas DC-9-15
Boeing 737-300

Gallery

References

External links

 Aviacsa
 Aviacsa (.com.mx domain) (Archive)

Defunct airlines of Mexico
Airlines established in 1990
Airlines disestablished in 2011
Companies based in Mexico City